Adrián Solano (born 17 October 1951) is a Costa Rican former cyclist. He competed in the team time trial at the 1968 Summer Olympics.

References

External links
 

1951 births
Living people
Costa Rican male cyclists
Olympic cyclists of Costa Rica
Cyclists at the 1968 Summer Olympics
People from San José, Costa Rica